The Swanley New Barn Railway is a  gauge railway located in Swanley Park, Swanley, Kent, United Kingdom.  It is signalled throughout with the signals being controlled from New Barn Station which also serves as a terminus.

The stations

New Barn 
This station is the largest on the line. It has three platforms, a turntable, a ticket office and a signal box. All trains stop at this station, so they can be turned around and be prepared to travel back along the line. This process will often be performed by the juniors giving the drivers a quick break. Passengers are required to go through the ticket office and obtain tickets before they board the train (in the case of those starting their journey at New Barn) or get their tickets as they disembark (if they have travelled from Swanley Parkway). The platforms have been upgraded to the same standard as Swanley Parkway.  Though this station has capacity for three trains at one time, this rarely happens except on gala days. There are three platforms and a locomotive loop line where the engines can run around and couple back up to the train. The turntable is manually operated, and a signal directs the operator to a certain line. The station was previously called Lakeside.

Swanley Parkway 
This station is a single platform station located near the car park. Passengers board the train here and then proceed to New Barn station to disembark. The journey from this station to New Barn should take around three minutes. This station was made higher when the platform was redeveloped in 2006, making it easier for passengers to board and leave the train. There are some early plans for increasing the capacity of the station by adding a passing loop to create a second line to the station. It is unsure whether a separate platform to serve the second line will be built or the current platform will be converted to an Island Platform. This station was previously called New Barn Halt.

The signal box 
The signal box is located at New Barn Station, which is the larger of the two stations on the line. During the first year of the railway, a signal box was created to help control the points and signals around the station area. The signalman can see where the trains are by using the track circuits which are installed throughout the line. The track layout has been changed several times, all of the major changes are recorded to the left of the track diagram. The signal box was formally named Holborn Crossing in 2013 in memory of the society founding member Christopher Johnson, who during his BR career had been an area manager covering Holborn Viaduct, with the absence of a viaduct the last part was changed to 'crossing'.

The signal box utilises two automatic modes of operation, which means that if there is a lack of staff, the railway line remains operational. The signal box frame has 35 levers, all of which are fully interlocked. The interlocking works with the track circuits and point detection. Which levers are locked is decided by the signal box computer which receives points positions, track circuit data and lever information to decide if it is possible to set a route that will not cause a train to be sent in the wrong direction or be sent on a route where another train is set to cross the track in front of it. The points are worked by 12 V windscreen wiper motors which have been adjusted so that they stop in one of two positions. They are controlled by the signal box computer which is in turn controlled by the levers. The direction that the points are set to is detected by two microswitches located under the points.

The majority of signals are powered by a 12-volt AC supply. The main signal that everyone sees is the one that passengers pass on their way into the station. It has three 20 W bulbs which allow the signal to be seen clearly no matter what the conditions are. The signal located at the platform on Swanley Parkway is powered by a 110 V transformer located inside the signal box.

Locomotives

Steam engines 
 Owd Rosie - 2-6-2T: Painted brown, it is similar to a Tinkerbell class locomotive. Currently undergoing a complete rebuild.
 Montezuma - 2-8-0: It was mainly seen running on Sundays with her American style wagons. Currently out of service. 
 Mallard - 4-6-2: This locomotive is the only scale model based at the railway. It is a model of the full-size engine of the same name (the Mallard), which broke the world speed record for steam locomotives in 1938. This model was used in the filming of the Sky advert, shown during Christmas 2012. Currently out of service for a rebuild. 
 Sir Goss - 2-4-0T: This is a long standing main-stay of the main steam locomotive fleet. It is occasionally seen at the Moors Valley Railway. It returned to service in 2021 wearing a blue livery, having been rebuilt by Moors Valley Railway locomotive works.
 Prince Sheian - 2-4-0: This locomotive entered service 3 April 2010 and is painted red. Currently out of service for routine boiler work and other changes. 
 Suisaidh - 2-4-4T: Built on and off site, based on the engine Jason from the Moors Valley Railway painted in LNER apple green, she entered passenger service in December 2007. Currently out of service. 
 Aneirin - Single fairlie, 0-4-4T: Based on Talieslin of the Ffestiniog railway. Entered service October 2015. Built by P. Beevers.
 Mrs. Darling - a Tinkerbell based design, 0-4-2T: Based on Tinkerbell of the Moors Valley railway. Entered service August 2017. Built by P. Jackson.

Diesel engines 
 Tulyar - Arrived on site in 1987, now painted in a two-tone green livery. For a long time, was the most-used engine on the railway and completed  of passenger service in 20 years. She is now out of service for a well earned rebuild. 
 Kestrel - Arrived on site in 1999, the yellow livery features a Hawker Siddeley logo with permission. Currently in regular service having been rebuilt in 2014.
 SNCF - Arrived on site in 2001, based on the older style French SNCF locomotive which is now based in a museum. Currently out of service. 
 Tegen - 4wd. Build in house by John Deans. Sit in style narrow gauge diesel. Freelance design. In service. 
 Skipper- A freelance narrow gauge diesel engine. Arriving for testing in early 2011, she was expected to enter service in April 2011 (after receiving her shiny new paint). Skipper was expertly built by Peter Beevers and is the fourth sit in diesel outline engine he has built (2 are at Barking Light railway). The engine has a sideways sitting seat to allow shunting to be completed easily. In service. 
 Western Enterprise - Arrived on site in May 2012, built by the same company as Tulyar, Hymek, County of Kent, Kestrel and SNCF. Western Enterprise is based on a BR Western diesel. In service. 
 Robert F Fairlie - Arrived on site in August 2012, second new diesel engine of 2012, and mechanically similar to Western Enterprise and also Made by Mardyke Miniature Railways. Painted in Large logo BR livery and is the second class 47 to be based at the SNBR. In service. 
 Niseag - Arrived on site in August 2013. Mechanically similar to Western Enterprise and also made by Mardyke Miniature Railways. Painted in NSE livery and is the third class 47 to be based at the SNBR. In service.
Phoenix, entered Service 8th August 2015. This loco is intended as test bed for ideas to improve the design of the existing diesel fleet. It is anticipated that any improvements will be incorporated in the specification of future locos. Like the mythical bird from which it takes its name, it is likely to be reborn with different features. The basic chassis is an old Mardyke one which started life under the Kestrel body, its body originated as old concept version of a Eurostar body, but has been extensively re-modelled. Its first task is to test a new type of hydraulic pump with a view to replacing the existing ones in use with the hope of improving reliability and drivability.
Queen's Messenger - whilst visually and mechanically similar to the Mardyke locomotives based at the SNBR, Queen's Messenger was built by an SNBR member. It is based on a class 67 locomotive that regularly pulls British Pullman trains on the mainline. In service.

Other motive power 
 Steptoe - BR class 25 engine, used occasionally.
 "Nipa" - This is a freelance sit in petrol engine, mainly used as the P-Way engine, rarely used for passenger service. Build in-house in 2013. Was on loan to the Fancott Miniature Railway from early July to early November 2015.
 Yellow Peril - This is a small battery-powered vehicle that uses a car battery for power. It is occasionally used to transport wheelbarrows around site. This has been expertly built by two of the juniors.

Vandalism and events 
The railway commonly has to deal with issues of vandalism, including smashed windows. Damage to the electrical wiring for signals and track circuits. On one occasion graffiti appeared on a platform overnight. The track is occasionally lifted overnight, making it unsuitable for the trains to run on it. Once a burnt-out car was found littering the tracks.

Galas
Periodically the railway holds special events:

Charity Day: This is held on 1 January each year and is operated by steam engines only.
1812 night: An annual Swanley Park event including fireworks and a band. The railway operates a special service up to the launch of the 1st firework.
Summer gala: Started for the 30th birthday event, these have continued every summer since, with miniature traction engines, stalls and visiting engines on the main line".

References

External links 

 
 Photograph of New Barn Halt

Miniature railways in the United Kingdom
Tourist attractions in Kent
7¼ in gauge railways in England
Swanley